Another Lesson in Violence is a live album by the American thrash metal band Exodus.

This album comes after a large line-up change for Exodus. Paul Baloff, who originally left in 1986 after the release of Bonded by Blood, makes a return on vocals. Tom Hunting returns after leaving just before the Fabulous Disaster tour in 1989 due to illness. This is also Exodus's first album to feature Jack Gibson on bass. Robb Flynn of Vio-lence and Machine Head makes a guest appearance on "A Lesson in Violence".
 
In early 1998, a few months after the album was released, the band went on their second hiatus which lasted until 2001. In the following year, not long after the band had made their second reunion, long time Exodus frontman Steve "Zetro" Souza made a return to the band due to the death of Paul Baloff, brought on by a stroke.

This was the band's first collaboration with Andy Sneap, who produced the live album; he would produce, engineer, mix or master all of Exodus' albums, starting with, and including, Tempo of the Damned (2004).

Track listing

Personnel
Exodus
Paul Baloff – vocals
Gary Holt – guitars
Rick Hunolt – guitars
Jack Gibson – bass
Tom Hunting – drums

Production
Andy Sneap – producer with Exodus, mixing at Hyde Street Studios, San Francisco
Steve Remote – recording engineer
Bob Skye, Eric Skye, Francis Trouette, Jack Szczekocki – assistant engineers
Gabriel Shepard – mixing assistant
Strephon Taylor – cover artwork

References

Exodus (American band) albums
1997 live albums
Century Media Records live albums
Live thrash metal albums
Albums produced by Andy Sneap